Maria, Marie or Mary Taylor may refer to:

In advocacy
Mary Taylor (women's rights advocate) (1817–1893), English proponent of feminist ideologies
Mary Lee Taylor (1891–1944), pseudonym of American advertising executive
Marie Woolfolk Taylor (1893–1960), African-American co-founder of Alpha Kappa Alpha Sorority

In arts
Mary Perkins Taylor (1875–1931), American Impressionist painter and fabric artist
Mary Linley Taylor (1889–1982), English stage actress
Mary Taylor (artist) (born 1948), New Zealand children's author

In public service
Mary Jo Taylor (born 1953), American Republican member of Kansas Senate
Mary Taylor (Ohio politician) (born 1966), American Republican lieutenant governor of Ohio
Mary Elizabeth Taylor, American Assistant Secretary of State in 2018–2020

In religion
Mary Virginia Taylor (born 1950), American bishop in United Methodist Church

In science
 Mary S. Taylor (1885—before 1976), American bryologist
Marie Clark Taylor (1911–1990), American botanist
 J. Mary Taylor (1931–2019), American mammalogist

In sports 
Mary Isabella 'Peta' Taylor (1912–1989), English cricketer
Mary Taylor (baseball) (born before 1935), American player in 1953–54
Mary Taylor (cricketer) (born 2004), English cricketer

Characters
Mary Taylor (Coronation Street), portrayed since 2008 by Patti Clare on British soap opera

Other uses
Mary Taylor (pilot boat), 19th-century American yacht

See also
Maria Taylor (disambiguation)
List of people with surname Taylor